Haemaphysalis hystricis, the East Asian mountain haemaphysalid, is a hard-bodied tick of the genus Haemaphysalis. It is found in India, Sri Lanka, Vietnam, Myanmar, China, Japan, India, Indonesia, Laos, Taiwan and Thailand. It is an obligate ectoparasite of mammals. It is a potential vector of Kyasanur Forest disease virus, Coxiella sp., Ehrlichia sp., and Rickettsia japonica. In 2007, an unknown trypanosoma species known as Trypanosoma KG1 isolate was isolated from naturally infected H. hystricis ticks.

Parasitism
Adults parasitize various wild and domestic mammals such as domestic cattle, dogs, and humans.

References 

Ticks
Ixodidae
Animals described in 1897